Jimmy Burn (17 December 1877 – 7 September 1934) was an Australian rules footballer who played with Melbourne in the Victorian Football League (VFL).

Notes

External links 

1877 births
Australian rules footballers from Victoria (Australia)
Melbourne Football Club players
1934 deaths